Lobby Lud is a fictional character created in August 1927 by the Westminster Gazette, a British newspaper, now defunct. The character was used in readers' prize competitions during the summer period. Anonymous employees visited seaside resorts and afterwards wrote down a detailed description of the town they visited, without giving away its name. They also described a person they happened to see that day and declared him to be the "Lobby Lud" of that issue. Readers were given a pass phrase and had to try to guess both the location and the person described by the reporters. Anyone carrying the newspaper could challenge Lobby Lud with the phrase and receive five pounds (about £ in ).

The competition was created because people on holiday were known to be less likely to buy a newspaper. Some towns and large factories had holiday fortnights (called "wakes weeks" in the north of England); the town or works would all decamp at the same time. Circulation could drop considerably in the summer and proprietors hoped prizes would increase it.

The character's name was derived from the paper's telegraphic address, "Lobby, Ludgate". 

The British colloquial phrase "You are (name) and I claim my five pounds" is associated with Lobby Lud, despite being based on a similar idea thought up by a different paper.

Other papers
After demise of the Gazette in 1928 the competition continued in The Daily News, which became the News Chronicle from 1930, in turn being absorbed into the Daily Mail in 1960.
Other newspapers such as the Daily Mirror ran similar schemes. "You are (name) and I claim my five pounds", the most well-known phrase, seems to date from a Daily Mail version after World War II. A train, the Lobby Lud Express, was run to take Londoners to resorts Lobby visited.

In 1983 an original Lobby Lud – William Chinn – was discovered aged 91 in Cardiff, Wales. The Daily Mirrors "Chalkie White" continues to visit resorts, and the idea has been taken up by local radio stations and other media, often offering lesser prizes.  Chalkie is a typical nickname applied to people with the surname White. An example is Andy Capp's closest friend in a long-running Daily Mirror cartoon strip.

Lobby Lud in popular culture
Graham Greene's Brighton Rock (1938) uses a Lobby Lud character (called Kolley Kibber) as a plot device.
The device also appears in the ITV show Agatha Christie's Poirot episode "The Jewel Robbery at the Grand Metropolitan," though not in the original story written before the Lobby Lud phenomenon in 1924: on holiday at the seaside, Poirot is mistaken for the man in the newspaper contest, "Lucky Len".
In V. S. Naipaul's novel A House for Mr. Biswas (1961), Mr. Biswas, working as a journalist, tours Trinidad hoping to be approached with the phrase "You are the Scarlet Pimpernel and I claim the Sentinel prize!"
The phrase "You are X and I claim my five pounds" has become a humorous way of pointing out a similarity between a subject and a second person. It was regularly used by the British satirical magazine Private Eye, most notably on the cover of issue 180 in November 1968 which showed a photograph from the wedding of the former Jackie Kennedy in which the bride was depicted as saying: "You are Aristotle Onassis and I claim my five million pounds."

References

External links
 Reference in comp.sys.sinclair FAQ
 Private Eye, 1968 cover from issue 180 of Private Eye.
 Article by Paul Slade of Planet Slade

British culture
Lud, Lobby
Lud, Lobby
Competitions in the United Kingdom
Works originally published in British newspapers